Events in the year 1984 in  Israel.

Incumbents
 President of Israel – Chaim Herzog
 Prime Minister of Israel – Yitzhak Shamir (Likud) until 13 September, Shimon Peres (Alignment)
 President of the Supreme Court – Meir Shamgar
 Chief of General Staff – Moshe Levi
 Government of Israel – 20th Government of Israel until 13 September, 21st Government of Israel

Events

 23 July – The Israeli legislative election ends. The Alignment party wins a narrow victory, again becoming the largest party in the Knesset, but cannot form a government with any of the smaller parties. As a result, a national unity government with Likud is established. It is agreed that Alignment leader Shimon Peres and Likud leader Yitzhak Shamir will each hold the post of Prime Minister for two years.
 13 September – Shimon Peres presents the Twenty-first government of Israel and begins to serve as Prime Minister.
 21 November – The first immigrants in Operation Moses arrive from Ethiopia.

Israeli–Palestinian conflict 
The most prominent events related to the Israeli–Palestinian conflict which occurred during 1984 include:

Notable Palestinian militant operations against Israeli targets

The most prominent Palestinian Arab terror attacks committed against Israelis during 1984 include:

  12–13 April – The Kav 300 affair:
 12 April – Four Palestinian Arab terrorists hijack an Israeli Egged bus number 300 and hold hostage approximately 40 passengers.
 13 April – During an Israeli rescue operation on bus number 300 which had been hijacked the day before, one hostage and two terrorists are killed. Two other terrorists, who are taken off the bus alive, are killed by members of the Shin Bet.
 6 August – Israeli soldier Moshe Tamam is abducted by a terrorist cell composed of Israeli-Arabs. He is later murdered. His attackers are arrested and (in 1986) sentenced to life.
 19 October – Two terrorists attempt to infiltrate Israel by sea in an inflatable boat. An Israeli patrol boat intercepts them, and in an exchange of fire, the boat is sunk and two Israeli military personnel are injured.
 22 October – A terrorist kills two students at the Cremisan Monasterey in Jerusalem.
 29 November – A female Israeli soldier, Hadas Kadmi, goes missing; her body would be found two weeks later. Police conclude that she was abducted by terrorists who planned to use her as a bargaining chip to free Palestinian prisoners in Israel. As a result of her abduction, a new directive is issued prohibiting soldiers from hitchhiking at night.

Notable Israeli military operations against Palestinian militancy targets

The most prominent Israeli military counter-terrorism operations (military campaigns and military operations) carried out against Palestinian militants during 1984 include:

Unknown dates 
 The founding of the community settlement Har Amasa.

Notable births 
 7 January – Ran Danker, Israeli actor, singer, and model.
 11 January – Oshri Cohen, Israeli actor.
 24 January – Yotam Halperin, Israeli basketball player.
 4 March – Tamir Cohen, Israeli footballer.
 10 May – Pe'er Tasi, Israeli singer.
 27 November – Adi Himmelbleu, Israeli actress, model and TV host.

Notable deaths

 8 January – Rabbi Yisrael Abuhatzeira (born 1890), AKA the "Baba Sali", Moroccan-born Israeli rabbi and kabbalist.
 14 January – Paul Ben-Haim (born 1897) – German-born Israeli composer.
 19 February – David Hacohen (born 1898), Russian (Belarus)-born Israeli politician.
 1 April – Zelda (born 1914), Russian (Ukraine)-born Israeli poet.
 21 April – Marcel Janco (born 1895), Romanian-born Israeli painter and architect.
 9 May – Miriam Yalan-Shteklis (born 1900), Russian (Ukraine)-born Israeli writer and poet famous for her children's books.
 28 June – Yigael Yadin (born 1917), Israeli archeologist, politician and Military Chief of Staff.
 1 July – Moshé Feldenkrais (born 1904), Russian (Ukraine)-born Israeli physicist and the founder of the Feldenkrais Method.
 24 July – Arieh Sharon (born 1900), Austro-Hungarian (Galicia)-born Israeli architect.
 8 August – Avraham Even-Shoshan (born 1905), Russian (Belarus)-born Israeli linguist and Hebrew lexicographer.
 8 August – Ben-Zion Keshet (born 1914), Russian (Latvia)-born Israeli politician.

Major public holidays

See also
 1984 in Israeli film
 1984 in Israeli television
 1984 in Israeli music
 1984 in Israeli sport
 Israel at the 1984 Summer Olympics

References

External links